Anna Thangi is a 2005 Indian Kannada-language drama film starring Shiva Rajkumar and Radhika. It depicts the story of an elder brother's love and affection for younger sister. The film is directed and written by Om Sai Prakash and produced under Vijay films banner. The film, upon release, met with positive reviews and was remade into Telugu language with the title Gorintaku.

Cast

Shiva Rajkumar as Shivanna
Radhika as Lakshmi
Deepu
Hema Choudhary
Srinivasa Murthy
Sudharani
Doddanna
Vishal Hegde
Sundar Raj 
Dharma 
Rekha Kumar 
Soumyalatha 
Kamala Prakash 
B. K. Shankar 
Vaijanath Biradar 
Dingri Nagaraj 
Escorts Srinivas 
Rathasapthami Aravind 
Rajashekhar kotian 
Mukhyamantri Chandru
Bank Janardhan
Ramesh Bhat
Sadhu Kokila
Tennis Krishna

Soundtrack
All the songs are composed, written and scored by Hamsalekha. The music director of the Telugu version (Gorintaku) - S.A.Rajkumar retained three songs from this movie -  "Dum Dum Dum" as " Dum Dum Dum", "Anna Thangiyara" retained as "Anna Chellela" and "Anna Nammonadharu" retained as "Yeradilo Koila".

References

External links
Movie review
Official review

2005 films
2000s Kannada-language films
Indian drama films
Films scored by Hamsalekha
Kannada films remade in other languages
Films directed by Sai Prakash
2005 drama films